Shenton Way Bus Terminal (Malay: Pertukaran Bus Shenton Way; Chinese:珊顿道巴士终站) is a bus terminal in Singapore. It is located along its namesake road, Shenton Way, in Downtown Core. The first iteration of the bus terminal was opened on 20 June 1987, before being relocated twice in order to make way for other development works. The bus terminal was first moved to Palmer Road in 2010, before being shifted to its present location along Shenton Way in 2017.

History

Original terminal
The original Shenton Way Bus Terminal was designed and built by the former Public Works Department (now CPG Corporation) at an unspecified location under a viaduct carrying the East Coast Parkway. Its location was seen by The Straits Times as unusual, as no other bus terminals were being built under viaducts at the time.
The bus terminal was later transferred to the Ministry of Communications and Information on 20 June 1987, in a ceremony presided by Ho Kah Leong, and began operations towards the end of the month.

First relocation
The bus terminal was first relocated to Palmer Road on 26 April 2010 to make way for the construction of the Marina Coastal Expressway. However, as the bus terminal itself was not open to the public, commuters had to disembark or board buses at two bus stops in front of the bus terminal (one for alighting only; the other for boarding only) due to restrictions imposed on the public against entering the bus terminal premises.

Second relocation
Initially announced in October 2015, the bus terminal was then relocated again to Shenton Way on 25 June 2017 to make way for the construction of Prince Edward Road MRT station, as part of the Circle line Stage 6 extension scheduled to be completed by 2026. CCECC Singapore Pte Ltd was selected to construct the relocated bus terminal as part of Contract 8812. Existing bus services were amended to serve the relocated bus terminal on that day, skipping Palmer Road entirely. Unlike the Palmer Road terminal, the new terminal allows boarding within the terminal itself; however, alighting from buses continues to be performed at a separate bus stop, also located in front of the bus terminal. The relocated bus terminal also features new amenities that were not present in the Palmer Road terminal, such as a priority queue zone, bicycle parking lots and an air-conditioned staff lounge.

References

Bus stations in Singapore